Rayan Ny Aina Arnaldo Raveloson (born 16 January 1997) is a Malagasy professional footballer who plays as a midfielder for Auxerre. He also holds a French passport as he was raised in Réunion, where his mother is from.

Youth career
Raveloson is a product of Réunionnais club SS Jeanne d'Arc.

Club career

Tours
Raveloson started his career at French club Tours FC. He spent time with both the first team and the reserve team.

Troyes
In 2018, Raveloson signed for French Club ES Troyes AC. He helped them win promotion to Ligue 1 in the 2020/2021 season.

LA Galaxy
On 20 May 2021, Raveloson signed with Major League Soccer side LA Galaxy. He won an MLS Goal of the Week award in his first season for his bicycle kick goal against the Portland Timbers.

Auxerre
On 4 August 2022, LA Galaxy announced that it had transferred Raveloson to newly promoted Ligue 1 side Auxerre for a reported fee of $1.78 million, with potential add-ons to boost it above two million.

International career
Raveloson made his Madagascar national team debut on 2 June 2019, in a friendly against Luxembourg, as a half-time substitute for Faneva Imà Andriatsima. He played at 2019 Africa Cup of Nations when Madagascar made a sensational run to the quarterfinals.

Career statistics

Scores and results list Madagascar's goal tally first, score column indicates score after each Raveloson goal.

Honours
Individual
 Best XI (Match Day 26) : Ligue 2 Domino's 2020 

Orders
Knight Order of Madagascar: 2019

External links

References

1997 births
Living people
Association football midfielders
Malagasy footballers
People from Anosibe Ifanja
Malagasy people of Réunionnais descent
Madagascar international footballers
French footballers
Footballers from Réunion
People of Malagasy descent from Réunion
Ligue 1 players
Ligue 2 players
Tours FC players
ES Troyes AC players
2019 Africa Cup of Nations players
LA Galaxy players
Malagasy expatriate footballers
Expatriate soccer players in the United States
Major League Soccer players
AJ Auxerre players
Recipients of orders, decorations, and medals of Madagascar